A list of  narrow-gauge railways in the United States.

Railroads

See also

Narrow-gauge railroads in the United States
Heritage railway
 Large amusement railways
2 ft and 600 mm gauge railways in the United Kingdom
2 ft 6 in gauge railroads in the United States
3 ft gauge railroads in the United States
3 ft 6 in gauge railways in the United States

References